House of Frankenstein is a 1944 American horror film starring Boris Karloff, Lon Chaney Jr. and John Carradine. The film was directed by Erle C. Kenton based on a story by Curt Siodmak, and produced by Universal Pictures. The film is about Dr. Gustav Niemann who escapes from prison and promises to create a new body for his assistant Daniel. The two murder Professor Lampini and take over his sideshow that involves the corpse of Count Dracula. After disposing of the Count, the two move on to the ruins of Castle Frankenstein where they find the body of Frankenstein's monster and The Wolf Man Larry Talbot preserved in the castle. Niemann thaws them and promises to cure Talbot of his werewolf curse, but secretly plots to revive Frankenstein's monster instead.

The film began production with the intention to write a story involving several Universal horror properties. Universal had initially planned a film titled Chamber of Horrors to include several other of their horror-themed characters, but this project was halted with the idea later revived as House of Frankenstein. Filming began on April 4, 1944 with highest budget originally set for a Universal Frankenstein film at that time. Film ended in early May while the film with screenings starting in New York on December 15, 1944. This was not among the highest-grossing film for Universal that season, but managed to outgross other Universal horror-related output such as Ghost Catchers (1944) and The Invisible Man's Revenge (1944). On its original release in New York, Film historian Gregory W. Mank declared that, on the film's premiere in new York City, critics "made mincemeat" out of it. Later reviews focused on the absurdity of connecting the monsters together and the lack of scares in the film. A sequel, that involved much of the same cast and crew titled House of Dracula was released in 1945.

Plot
Dr. Gustav Niemann escapes from prison along with his hunchbacked assistant Daniel, for whom he promises to create a new, beautiful body. The two murder Professor Lampini, a traveling showman, and take over his horror exhibit. To exact revenge on Burgomaster Hussman, who had put him in prison, Niemann revives Count Dracula. Dracula seduces Hussmann's granddaughter-in-law Rita and kills Hussmann himself, but in a subsequent chase, Niemann disposes of Dracula's coffin, causing the vampire to perish in the sunlight.
Niemann and Daniel move on to the flooded ruins of Castle Frankenstein in Visaria, where they find the bodies of the Frankenstein Monster and Larry Talbot, the Wolf Man, preserved in the frozen castle. Niemann thaws them and promises to find Talbot a cure for the curse. Niemann is more interested in reviving the Monster and exacting revenge on two traitorous former associates than in keeping his promises. Talbot transforms into a werewolf and kills a man, sending the villagers into a panic.

Niemann and Daniel save a gypsy girl named Ilonka, and Daniel falls in love with her; it is unrequited, however, as Ilonka falls in love with Talbot. Daniel tells Ilonka that Talbot is a werewolf, but she is undeterred, and promises Talbot that she will help him. Events reach a crisis point when Niemann revives the Monster and Talbot again turns into a werewolf. The werewolf attacks and fatally wounds Ilonka, but she manages to shoot and kill Talbot with a silver bullet before she dies. Daniel blames Niemann and turns on him. The Monster intervenes, throws Daniel out of the window, and carries the half-conscious Niemann outside, where the villagers chase them into the marshes. There, both the Monster and Niemann drown in quicksand.

Cast
Cast sourced from the book Universal Horrors:

Production

Background and pre-production
Prior to the announcement of House of Frankenstein, a film titled Chamber of Horrors was announced on June 7, 1943 by The Hollywood Reporter, noting that the cast would include Boris Karloff, Lon Chaney, Jr., Bela Lugosi, Peter Lorre, Claude Rains, George Zucco and James Barton as well as including the characters the Invisible Man, the Mad Ghoul, the Mummy and "other assorted monsters". Chamber of Horrors never went into production. Curt Siodmak spoke little on developing the story for the film, stating that "the idea was to put all the horror characters into one picture. I only wrote the story. I didn't write the script. I never saw the picture". The screenplay was written by Edward T. Lowe, who had previously written scripts for The Hunchback of Notre Dame (1923) and The Vampire Bat (1933). Lowe's script changed parts of Siodmak's story, including removing the mummy Kharis. Siodmak later stated he only wrote the story, and never saw the finished film.

The film's producer Paul Malvern began assigning a cast that included Karloff, who Universal had on for a two-picture deal, Lon Chaney, Jr., John Carradine and J. Carrol Naish. The cast would not officially be assembled until February 1944. On discussions with the cast, Anne Gwynne confided later in an interview with Michael Fitzgerald that she did not think Karloff was happy with his mad scientist role in the film. In an interview in early 1944, Karloff stated he would "never play Frankenstein's Monster again [...] Other people have taken similar roles and the edge is off of it. I am through with it.... I made these horror films. They were of little importance in anybody's scheme of things, including my own, and though I did make a disgraceful amount of money, I was getting nowhere." Gwynne spoke of her role later in her career stating that "the part was nice but not great, I had fun with it, but I'm only in the first 25 minutes and then zap, I'm off for the rest of the film!"

The role of the Monster was given to Glenn Strange who over the previous 12 years spent his time in Western films and had played small parts in Universal's The Mummy's Tomb (1942), as well as Producers Releasing Corporation's The Mad Monster (1942) and The Monster Maker (1944). Prior to Strange's casting, Lane Chandler was tested for the role. Strange was unaware that a new actor was being called to play the Monster and only found out when he was reported to Jack Pierce's make-up studio to have a scar applied to him. After which, Pierce phoned producer Paul Malvern stating they had found their new Monster.

Filming

Preparations for House of Frankenstein began in August 1943 under the title The Devil's Brood. The film's budget was $354,000 This was the highest budget set for a Universal Frankenstein film at that time, though Frankenstein (1931) and Bride of Frankenstein exceeded this amount by running over-budget. It was given a 30-day shooting schedule with initial shooting to begin on April 4, 1944 using the sets from Green Hell (1940) and Pittsburgh (1942). Other sets from Gung Ho! (1943) and Tower of London (1939) were also used.

Director Erle C. Kenton spoke positively about working on horror films in a 1944 interview, stating "They give us a chance to let our imagination run wild. The art department can go to town on creep sets. Prop men have fun with cobwebs. The cameraman has fun with trick lighting and shadows. The director has fun. We have more fun making a horror picture than a comedy."
On set, Carradine treated his company to recitations of Shakespeare's work while Lon Chaney would occasionally prepare lavish lunches for his dressing room co-stars. Strange noted the Monster-make up was uncomfortable on set, making it feel like he had water on the brain and that he was not allowed into the studio commissary, having to eat a sack lunch away from others. Accidents on set occurred when Strange was in a glass case and found he could not breathe, forcing him to push a panic button to escape from its confines. Strange also had a scene where he throws J. Carrol Naish through a window to a prop mattress to land. Strange misjudged his throw, leading to Naish missing the mattress and landing on the cement floor. Naish was wearing his large padded hunchback, which cushioned his fall sufficiently. Director Erle C. Kenton set the scenes involving Count Dracula to be shot last. Filming completed on May 8. The music score was a collaborative effort between Hans J. Salter, Paul Dessau and Charles Previn. Most of the music in the film was written specifically for House of Frankenstein, as opposed to the usual collection of musical cues dating back to 1938 that were in other films of the period.

Release
Despite filming being completed in May, the film had several months before premiering. In this time, the film's title was changed to House of Frankenstein. House of Frankenstein was shown at the 594-seat Rialto Theatre in New York City on December 15, 1944. The film was so popular at the theatre, that it ran the film all night on December 15. The film played at the theatre for three weeks. On December 22, House of Frankenstein and The Mummy's Curse opened at the 1100-seat Hawaii Theatre in Hollywood. The film continued screening there for six weeks. On February 20, the film had a week long run at Los Angeles's 2200-seat Orpheum Theatre. The film was distributed theatrically by Universal Pictures. The film was released nationally on February 16, 1945 following the initial in New York premieres in December 1944. According to the National Box Office Digest, the film grossed between $200,000 to $500,000. This was not among the highest grossing films for Universal which included Can't Help Singing (1944) and Ali Baba and the Forty Thieves (1944) as well as the studios other horror outings with The Climax (1944) which both grossed over $500,000. It managed to outgross other Universal horror-related output such as Ghost Catchers (1944) and The Invisible Man's Revenge (1944).

The first news of a follow-up to House of Frankenstein (1944) appeared in Hollywood trade papers in April 1944 with the announcement of a film titled Wolf Man vs. Dracula, the script of which differed greatly from that for House of Dracula. Bernard Schubert was hired to write the script and turned in his first draft on May 19. House of Dracula is a continuation of the film House of Frankenstein and used much of that film's crew. Repeated actors include John Carradine as Count Dracula, Glen Strange as Frankenstein's monster, and Chaney Jr. as The Wolf Man. It was released on December 7, 1945.

House of Frankenstein was not released on home video until the 1992 home video releases by MCA Home Video. The film was released on DVD as part of The Monster Legacy Collection and Frankenstein: The Legacy Collection on April 27, 2004. House of Frankenstein was released on Blu-ray on August 28, 2018.

Reception
Film historian Gregory W. Mank declared that, on the film's premiere in new York City, critics "made mincemeat" out of it. Wanda Hale of the New York Daily News gave the film a two-and-a-half star rating, commenting that "settings, lighting and costumes, impressively eerie and horrendous, will help you enter into the sinister proceedings", while noting that audiences should "be sure and check your credulity outside". A. H. Weiller of The New York Times stated that as a film "this grisly congress doesn't hit hard; it merely has speed and a change of pace. As such, then, it is bound to garner as many chuckles as it does chills". The New York Herald Tribune gave a negative review stating the "plot stumbles along endlessly in its top-heavy attempt to carry on its shoulders too many of yesterday's nightmares" concluding that the film "is only a little more terrifying than the house that Jack built".

Harrison's Reports called it "only a mild horror picture, more ludicrous than terrifying. The whole thing is a rehash of the fantastic doings of these characters in previous pictures and, since they do exactly what is expected of them, the spectator is neither shocked nor chilled". A reviewer in The Motion Picture Herald deemed the picture as an "excellent horror film", complimenting the acting, makeup, clever photography, lighting and score, noting that at their screening at the Rialto Theatre in New York, the "matinee audience was more than satisfied". In 1946 Boris Karloff, referred to the film as "the monster clambake", while working on Val Lewton-produced pictures for RKO, referring to Lewton as "the man who rescued me from the living dead and restored my soul."

From retrospective reviews, Carlos Clarens wrote about the Monster Rally films in his book An Illustrated History of the Horror Film summarizing that "the sole charm of these films resides in the very proficient contract players that populated them, portraying gypsies, mad scientists, lustful high priests, vampire-killers, or mere red herrings". In his book Horror!, Drake Douglas commented that "The Monster became a clumsy automation", noting that Strange's monster "had chubby cheeks and dead eyes and the face of a mindless somnambulist rather than a vibrantly living, evil creature". In his book overviewing Universal's Frankenstein series, Gregory W. Mank stated that, despite virtues of a "beautiful score and its grand cast", the film "never succeeded in transcending its ignoble purpose: to cram together as many horrors as 70 minutes allow. Nor has it ever been forgiven by the more discriminating terror film aficionados for taking another giant step in the degradation of Frankenstein's monster". A review in Phil Hardy's book Science Fiction (1984) declared that "the film's cheap-skate opportunity verges on surrealism at times as it moves from monster to monster with bewildering rapidity." while finding the film less ludicrous than its follow-up, House of Dracula. Kim Newman summarized the Monster Rally films in his book The Definitive Guide to Horror Movies, stating that they were endearing in trying to find ways around the monsters seemingly permanent deaths but that they also "don't even try to be terrifying, and seem to be entirely pitched at children's matinees."

See also
 List of horror films of the 1940s
 List of Universal Pictures films (1940–1949)

References

Sources

External links

 
 
 

1944 horror films
1944 films
1940s science fiction horror films
American black-and-white films
American science fiction horror films
American sequel films
American vampire films
Dracula (Universal film series)
Films about Romani people
Horror crossover films
Films scored by Paul Dessau
Films directed by Erle C. Kenton
Frankenstein (Universal film series)
Universal Pictures films
American werewolf films
Films set in Europe
1940s English-language films
1940s American films